Amboy Township may refer to:

Amboy Township, Lee County, Illinois
Amboy Township, Michigan
Amboy Township, Minnesota
Amboy Township, Fulton County, Ohio

Township name disambiguation pages